Tiptree Heath is a hamlet in the Colchester district, in the county of Essex, England. Nearby settlements include the villages of Tiptree, Great Totham, Great Braxted and Little Totham. For transport there is the B1022 road which the hamlet is on, and the B1023 and A12 roads. There is a nature reserve called Tiptree Heath Nature Reserve.

Hamlets in Essex
Tiptree